Methylophaga marina is an obligately methylotrophic, Gram-negative, strictly aerobic, motile, rod-shaped bacteria, the type species of its genus. Its type strain is ATCC 35842 (= NCMB 2244).

References

Further reading

External links

LPSN
Type strain of Methylophaga marina at BacDive -  the Bacterial Diversity Metadatabase

Piscirickettsiaceae
Bacteria described in 1985